The 2010–11 WCHA women's ice hockey season marked the continuation of the annual tradition of competitive ice hockey among Western Collegiate Hockey Association members.

Offseason
June 18: Seven University of Minnesota players have been named to the United States Under-22 Team. Megan Bozek, Sarah Erickson, Amanda Kessel, Anne Schleper, Jen Schoullis and Emily West have all been named to the team. The Minnesota contingent is the largest group from one school.
June 29: In March 2012, Minnesota Duluth will be the host school for the 2012 NCAA Division l Frozen Four women's tournament. The tournament will be held at the new Amsoil Arena, next to the current Duluth Entertainment Convention Center. The Bulldogs hosted the Frozen Four in both 2008 and 2003.
September 22: Hilary Knight from Wisconsin was selected as the WCHA Pre-Season Player of the Year while Amanda Kessel from Minnesota was the WCHA Pre-Season Rookie of the Year.
September 28: In the USA Today/USA Hockey Magazine Women's College Hockey Poll, the Minnesota Duluth Bulldogs have been voted as the pre-season Number 1.

Exhibition

Season standings

Regular season

News and notes
September 13: The Minnesota-Bulldogs visit the White House and are honored in a Rose Garden ceremony with President Barack Obama as the 2010 NCAA National Champions.
October 1: In her first game as a Golden Gopher, Amanda Kessel registered four points (two goals, two assists) in a 5–0 victory over Clarkson. The following day, Kessel scored the game-winning goal as the Gophers won by a 3–0 score.
Oct 5: North Dakota was ranked 10th in the Uscho.com poll. It is only the second time in program history that the club was in the top 10 in either the USA Today or Uscho.com poll. The last time came during the 2008–09 season after a 7-2-1 start.
Oct 11: In front of 1,469 fans, the Fighting Sioux defeated top-ranked Minnesota Duluth by a 4–2 mark. It marks the second time in the past two seasons that the Sioux have defeated a number one ranked team. The first time North Dakota beat a #1 team was against Wisconsin in 2009. This is also the first time that the Sioux have beaten the Bulldogs at home (and the third win against them ever).
October 16: Alana McElhinney made a career-high 56 saves. In the game, Bemidji State had its first-ever win over a No. 1-ranked team as they defeated the Mercyhurst Lakers by a 5–3 mark.
October 29–30: Erin Cody had the biggest weekend of her collegiate career. She was involved in all seven of the Bemidji State's goals, as the Beavers swept St. Cloud State. Cody had five goals and two assists, and was a factor in both game-winning goals. Cody earned the First Star of the Game honors in both games. In the first game, Cody scored a natural hat trick (a power-play, shorthanded, and even-strength goal). All three goals were scored in the first period and set a Beavers record for most goals scored by a single player in one period. In the second game, Cody had two goals and two assists.
October 22: Rookie Kathleen Rogan scored a hat trick as Minnesota State beat eighth ranked North Dakota. Rogan's hat trick marks is the first for Minnesota State since Maverick Ashley Young scored three goals against Bemidji State in 2008.
On October 23, 2010, Jocelyne Lamoureux had a hat trick and one assist. In addition, one of her goals was the game-winning goal. The hat trick was the first by a North Dakota player since Cami Wooster in 2005.
Jan 21-22: Wisconsin right winter Meghan Duggan led the top-ranked Badgers with four scoring points in a win and tie at defending national champion Minnesota Duluth. Duggan registered two goals and two assists against the Bulldogs, recorded nine shots on goal and finished with a +4 plus/minus rating in the two games. She led all players with three points in the January 21 win (4-1). She scored the Badgers first goal of the game (it was the first women's college hockey goal scored at the Bulldogs new AMSOIL Arena). In the second period, she assisted on a power-play tally to give Wisconsin a 3–0 lead. In the final two minutes, she had an empty net goal. The following day, both clubs skated to a 4–4 tie (Wisconsin prevailed 2–1 in the shootout). Duggan assisted on the Badgers' second goal of the game and extended her current point streak to 22 games, the longest individual point streak in Wisconsin women's hockey history. On January 21, she broke the previous mark of 20 games set by Meghan Hunter from Oct. 14, 2000 to Jan. 12, 2001.
The January 29, 2011 game between Wisconsin and Minnesota was played before a women's college hockey record crowd of 10,668.

National rankings
October 12: The WCHA had five of its teams ranked in the two national polls for the week. It is believed to be the first time five WCHA teams have ever been ranked among the top 10 in the nation at one time.

In season honors

Players of the week
Throughout the conference regular season, WCHA offices names a player of the week each Monday.

Defensive Players of the week

Rookies of the week
Throughout the conference regular season, WCHA offices names a rookie of the week each Monday.

Postseason

2011 WCHA Women's Ice Hockey Tournament

Final faceoff

NCAA tournament
March 6:  Three teams from the Western Collegiate Hockey Association, winners of the last 11 women's national championship, have been selected to play in the quarterfinals of the 2011 NCAA Div. 1 Hockey Championships. No. 1 Wisconsin (34-2-2) will host defending national champion Minnesota Duluth (22-8-3) in the quarterfinal round. The Badgers earned the WCHA's automatic berth to the national tournament after winning the WCHA FINAL FACE-OFF. Minnesota (26-9-2) will play at No. 3 seed Boston College (23-6-6). UW defeated Minnesota 5–4 in overtime in the championship game.

Awards and honors
Brianna Decker, 2011 Second Team All-America
Meghan Duggan, 2011 Patty Kazmaier Award winner
Meghan Duggan, 2011 First Team All-America
Hilary Knight, 2011 First Team All-America
 Jocelyne Larocque, 2011 First Team All-America selection
 Noora Raty, 2011 Second Team All-America

See also
National Collegiate Women's Ice Hockey Championship
2009–10 WCHA women's ice hockey season
2010–11 CHA women's ice hockey season
2010–11 Hockey East women's ice hockey season
2010–11 ECAC women's ice hockey season

References

WCHA
Western Collegiate Hockey Association